Marc P. Christensen is the 17th president of Clarkson University in Potsdam, New York.

Early life, education, and career

Christensen earned his Bachelor of Science degree in engineering physics from Cornell University, and his Master of Science in electrical engineering and Ph.D. in electrical and computer engineering from George Mason University.

Early in his academic career, Christensen was identified by the Defense Advanced Research Projects Agency as a "rising star in microsystems research." He began his professional career as a technical leader in BDM's Sensors and Photonics Group, now part of Northrop Grumman Mission Systems. In 1997, he co-founded Applied Photonics, an optical interconnection company that provided hardware demonstrations for multiple DARPA programs.

In 2002, he joined Southern Methodist University where he rose through the ranks and served as the department chair of Electrical Engineering from 2007 to 2012 and Dean of the Lyle School of Engineering from 2012 to 2022.

In 2008, Christensen was recognized for outstanding research with the Gerald J. Ford Research Fellowship. In 2010, he was selected as the inaugural Bobby B. Lyle Professor of Engineering Innovation. In 2011, he was recognized for outstanding and innovative teaching as a recipient of the Altshuler Distinguished Teaching Professor Award.

Christensen is a leader in photonics research and technology development and holds 10 U.S. patents.

Clarkson University

The Clarkson University Board of Trustees appointed Christensen to serve as the 17th President of Clarkson University, effective July 1, 2022. Christensen and his wife, Seema Christensen, took up residence in Foster House on the Clarkson University campus in summer 2022.

References

1971 births
American electrical engineers
Optical engineers
Cornell University alumni
George Mason University alumni
Southern Methodist University faculty
Clarkson University faculty
Heads of universities and colleges in the United States
Living people